These are the results for the 2004 edition of the Paris–Nice bicycle race, won by Jörg Jaksche, who had been fourth in 2003.

Stages

07-03-2004: Chaville – Vanves, 13.2 km. (ITT)

08-03-2004: Chaville – Montargis, 166.5 km.

09-03-2004: La Chapelle-Saint-Ursin – Roanne, 227.5 km.

10-03-2004: Roanne – Le Puy-en-Velay, 179 km. 
Stage cancelled because of heavy snowfall.

11-03-2004: Le Puy-en-Velay – Rasteau, 215 km

12-03-2004: Rasteau – Gap, 173.5 km.

13-03-2004: Digne-les-Bains – Cannes, 185.5 km.

14-03-2004: Nice, 144 km.

General Standings

Mountains Classification

Points Classification

2004
2004 in road cycling
2004 in French sport
March 2004 sports events in France